Adson may refer to:

Surname:
 Alfred Washington Adson (1887–1951), American doctor (Adson's sign is named after him)
 Artur Adson (1889–1977), Estonian poet, writer and theatre critic
 John Adson (c. 1587 – 1640), English musician and composer

Given name:
 Adson Alves da Silva (born 1982), Brazilian footballer
 Adson Ferreira Soares (born 2000), Brazilian footballer